Kalathur East is a village in Kalathur panchayat in Thanjavur district in the state of Tamil Nadu, in southeastern India.

Villages in Thanjavur district